The 6th Luftwaffe Field Division was an infantry division of the Luftwaffe branch of the Wehrmacht that fought in World War II. It was formed using surplus ground crew of the Luftwaffe and served on the Eastern Front from late 1942 to June 1944 when it was destroyed during Operation Bagration.

Operational history

The 6th Luftwaffe Field Division, one of several such divisions of the Luftwaffe (German Air Force), was formed in September 1942 in Gross-Born Troop Maneuver Area, under the command of Oberst Ernst Weber. Intended to serve as infantry, its personnel were largely drawn from surplus Luftwaffe ground crew. In November 1942, it was assigned to the 3rd Panzer Army in Army Group Centre on the Eastern Front and posted to a sector near Nevel. Here it defended against Soviet operations in the area.

In November 1943, responsibility for the division was transferred to the Army and it was renamed the 6th Field Division (L). Shortly afterwards, its Field Jager battalions became the 52nd, 53rd and 54th Jager regiments while its original artillery, tank destroyer and flak battalions was integrated into a new 6th Artillery Regiment. In the summer of 1944, the 6th Field Division held an area to the east of Vitebsk as part of LIII Corps of the 3rd Panzer Army. The division was encircled during the Vitebsk–Orsha Offensive at Vitebsk within days of the start of the Soviet Army's Operation Bagration on 22 June 1944. The division was destroyed with its commander, Generalleutnant Rudolf Peschel, killed in action on 27 June 1944.

Commanders
 Oberst Ernst Weber (September–November 1942); 
 Generalmajor Rüdiger von Heyking (November 1942–November 1943); 
 Generalleutnant Rudolf Peschel (November 1943–27 June 1944).

Notes
Footnotes

Citations

References

 
 

0*006
Military units and formations established in 1942
Military units and formations disestablished in 1944